Carmiooro NGC was a professional cycling team, whose license was held in Great Britain. It was founded in 2008 by Lorenzo Di Silvestro who was the Team Manager and Natale Bellotti, the team's president. The team rose to the UCI Professional Continental category in 2010, and disbanded after the season. The Directeur sportif is Jean Philippe Duracka and his assistant is Roberto Miodini

The team have in its roster Emanuele Sella who recently returned to the sport after a one-year suspension Sella has won 4 stages in the Giro d'Italia, Italy's biggest cycling event.

Major wins 
2008
Stage 6 Tour of Japan, Alexandre Aulas
Stage 2 Tour de Slovaquie, Fabio Terrenzio
2009
Stage 3 Étoile de Bessèges, Jure Kocjan
Overall Tour of Japan, Sergio Pardilla
Stage 5, Sergio Pardilla
Stage 6 Circuito Montañés, Sergio Pardilla
Stage 2 Vuelta a la Comunidad de Madrid, Francisco Ventoso
Stage 2 & 7 Tour of Qinghai Lake
Overall Paris–Corrèze, Francisco Ventoso
Stage 1 Tour du Gévaudan, Francisco Ventoso
Overall Cinturo de l'Emporda, Francisco Ventoso
Stage 1 & 2, Francisco Ventoso
Stage 3, Emanuele Sella
Gran Premio Bruno Beghelli, Francisco Ventoso
Overall Tour of Hainan, Francisco Ventoso
Stage 4, Francisco Ventoso
2010
Stage 1 Vuelta a Andalucía, Sergio Pardilla
Stage 5 Vuelta a Andalucía, Francisco Ventoso
Grand Prix Pino Cerami, Jure Kocjan
GP Industria & Artigianato di Larciano, Daniele Ratto
Stage 2 Ster Elektrotoer, Francisco Ventoso
Overall Vuelta a la Comunidad de Madrid, Sergio Pardilla
Stage 2, Francisco Ventoso
Stage 3, Sergio Pardilla
Overall Paris–Brussels, Francisco Ventoso

2010 Team

References

External links 
 

Cycling teams based in the United Kingdom
Defunct cycling teams based in the United Kingdom
Cycling teams established in 2008
Cycling teams disestablished in 2010